The Teal Creek, formerly known as Little River, is a perennial stream of the Genoa River catchment, located in the East Gippsland region of the Australian state of Victoria.

Course and features
The creek flows generally northeast, then southeast, before reaching its mouth in the northeastern arm of the Mallacoota Wildlife Reserve within the Mallacoota Inlet in the Shire of East Gippsland. The creek descends  over its  course.

See also

 List of rivers of Australia

References

External links
 

East Gippsland catchment
Rivers of Gippsland (region)